The following species in the flowering plant genus Heptapleurum are accepted by Plants of the World Online. Heptapleurum was resurrected from Schefflera in 2020.

Heptapleurum actinophyllum 
Heptapleurum acuminatissimum 
Heptapleurum acutissimum 
Heptapleurum affine 
Heptapleurum agamae 
Heptapleurum agasthiyamalayanum 
Heptapleurum albidobracteatum 
Heptapleurum alongense 
Heptapleurum alpinum 
Heptapleurum altigenum 
Heptapleurum alvarezii 
Heptapleurum amungwiwae 
Heptapleurum angiense 
Heptapleurum angilogense 
Heptapleurum angustifolium 
Heptapleurum apiculatum 
Heptapleurum arboricola 
Heptapleurum archboldianum 
Heptapleurum arfakense 
Heptapleurum aromaticum 
Heptapleurum avene 
Heptapleurum banahaense 
Heptapleurum barbatum 
Heptapleurum beamanii 
Heptapleurum beccarianum 
Heptapleurum bengalense 
Heptapleurum benguetense 
Heptapleurum binuangense 
Heptapleurum bipalmatifolium 
Heptapleurum blancoi 
Heptapleurum bodinieri 
Heptapleurum bordenii 
Heptapleurum boridianum 
Heptapleurum borneense 
Heptapleurum bougainvilleanum 
Heptapleurum bourdillonii 
Heptapleurum bractescens 
Heptapleurum brassaiellum 
Heptapleurum brassii 
Heptapleurum brevipedicellatum 
Heptapleurum brevipes 
Heptapleurum bukidnonense 
Heptapleurum burkillii 
Heptapleurum buxifolioides 
Heptapleurum calyptratum 
Heptapleurum cambodianum 
Heptapleurum canaense 
Heptapleurum capitatum 
Heptapleurum capituliferum 
Heptapleurum caroli 
Heptapleurum carrii 
Heptapleurum catanduanense 
Heptapleurum catense 
Heptapleurum caudatifolium 
Heptapleurum caudatum 
Heptapleurum cavaleriei 
Heptapleurum cephalotes 
Heptapleurum chaetorrhachis 
Heptapleurum chandrasekharanii 
Heptapleurum chanii 
Heptapleurum chapanum 
Heptapleurum chartaceum 
Heptapleurum chevalieri 
Heptapleurum chinense 
Heptapleurum cinnamomeum 
Heptapleurum clarkei 
Heptapleurum clementis 
Heptapleurum corymbiforme 
Heptapleurum crassibracteatum 
Heptapleurum crassifolium 
Heptapleurum crassissimum 
Heptapleurum crenatum 
Heptapleurum cumingii 
Heptapleurum cuneatum 
Heptapleurum curranii 
Heptapleurum delavayi 
Heptapleurum demesae 
Heptapleurum dentatum 
Heptapleurum digitatum 
Heptapleurum divaricatum 
Heptapleurum dongnaiense 
Heptapleurum ellipticum 
Heptapleurum elliptifoliolum 
Heptapleurum emarginatum 
Heptapleurum enneaphyllum 
Heptapleurum eriocephalum 
Heptapleurum eucaudatum 
Heptapleurum exaltatum 
Heptapleurum fantsipanense 
Heptapleurum farinosum 
Heptapleurum fastigiatum 
Heptapleurum fengii 
Heptapleurum feriarum 
Heptapleurum filipes 
Heptapleurum fimbriatum 
Heptapleurum foetidum 
Heptapleurum forbesii 
Heptapleurum foxworthyi 
Heptapleurum gigantifolium 
Heptapleurum gjellerupii 
Heptapleurum glabrescens 
Heptapleurum glabrum 
Heptapleurum glaucum 
Heptapleurum globosum 
Heptapleurum globuliferum 
Heptapleurum glomerulatum 
Heptapleurum gracile 
Heptapleurum gracilipes 
Heptapleurum griffithii 
Heptapleurum guizhouense 
Heptapleurum hainanense 
Heptapleurum halconense 
Heptapleurum havilandii 
Heptapleurum hellwigianum 
Heptapleurum hemiepiphyticum 
Heptapleurum heptaphyllum 
Heptapleurum heterobotryum 
Heptapleurum heterocladum 
Heptapleurum heterophyllum 
Heptapleurum hirsutum 
Heptapleurum hoi 
Heptapleurum hullettii 
Heptapleurum hunsteinianum 
Heptapleurum hypoleucoides 
Heptapleurum hypoleucum 
Heptapleurum insculptum 
Heptapleurum insigne 
Heptapleurum insularum 
Heptapleurum ischnoacrum 
Heptapleurum ischyrocephalum 
Heptapleurum janowskyi 
Heptapleurum junghuhnianum 
Heptapleurum kajonense 
Heptapleurum kaniense 
Heptapleurum khasianum 
Heptapleurum kinabaluense 
Heptapleurum kontumense 
Heptapleurum koordersii 
Heptapleurum koresii 
Heptapleurum kornasii 
Heptapleurum kraemeri 
Heptapleurum kuborense 
Heptapleurum kuchingense 
Heptapleurum lakhonense 
Heptapleurum lanatum 
Heptapleurum lanceolatum 
Heptapleurum lasiocalyx 
Heptapleurum lasiosphaerum 
Heptapleurum latifoliolatum 
Heptapleurum lawranceanum 
Heptapleurum laxiflorum 
Heptapleurum laxiusculum 
Heptapleurum leiophyllum 
Heptapleurum lenticellatum 
Heptapleurum leroyianum 
Heptapleurum leucanthum 
Heptapleurum leytense 
Heptapleurum lineamentorum 
Heptapleurum littorale 
Heptapleurum littoreum 
Heptapleurum locianum 
Heptapleurum longifolium 
Heptapleurum longifrutescens 
Heptapleurum lorentzii 
Heptapleurum lucescens 
Heptapleurum luridum 
Heptapleurum luzoniense 
Heptapleurum macgregorii 
Heptapleurum macranthum 
Heptapleurum macrophyllum 
Heptapleurum macrostachyum 
Heptapleurum maduraiense 
Heptapleurum mamutiacum 
Heptapleurum mangiferifolium 
Heptapleurum marlipoense 
Heptapleurum matsallehii 
Heptapleurum megalanthum 
Heptapleurum membranifolium 
Heptapleurum merrillii 
Heptapleurum merrittii 
Heptapleurum metcalfianum 
Heptapleurum microgyne 
Heptapleurum microphyllum 
Heptapleurum minahasae 
Heptapleurum minutipetiolatum 
Heptapleurum minutistellatum 
Heptapleurum mitragerum 
Heptapleurum mjoebergii 
Heptapleurum monticola 
Heptapleurum morobeanum 
Heptapleurum multiflorum 
Heptapleurum multifoliolatum 
Heptapleurum multinervium 
Heptapleurum multiramosum 
Heptapleurum multispicatum 
Heptapleurum myrianthellum 
Heptapleurum myriocarpum 
Heptapleurum nabirense 
Heptapleurum napuoense 
Heptapleurum nervosum 
Heptapleurum nhatrangense 
Heptapleurum nodosum 
Heptapleurum obliquum 
Heptapleurum oblongifolium 
Heptapleurum obovatifoliolatum 
Heptapleurum obovatilimbum 
Heptapleurum obovatum 
Heptapleurum obtusifolium 
Heptapleurum octandrum 
Heptapleurum oligodon 
Heptapleurum opacum 
Heptapleurum oreopolum 
Heptapleurum ovoideum 
Heptapleurum oxyphyllum 
Heptapleurum pachyphlebium 
Heptapleurum pachystylum 
Heptapleurum pacoense 
Heptapleurum pagiophyllum 
Heptapleurum palawanense 
Heptapleurum palmiforme 
Heptapleurum panayense 
Heptapleurum papuanum 
Heptapleurum parasiticum 
Heptapleurum parvifoliolatum 
Heptapleurum pauciflorum 
Heptapleurum pawoiense 
Heptapleurum peridotiticola 
Heptapleurum pes-avis 
Heptapleurum petelotii 
Heptapleurum petiolosum 
Heptapleurum phanerophlebium 
Heptapleurum philippinense 
Heptapleurum pilematophorum 
Heptapleurum piperoideum 
Heptapleurum platyphyllum 
Heptapleurum poilaneanum 
Heptapleurum politum 
Heptapleurum polyandrum 
Heptapleurum polyastrum 
Heptapleurum polybotryum 
Heptapleurum polychaetum 
Heptapleurum polycladum 
Heptapleurum poomae 
Heptapleurum porphyrantherum 
Heptapleurum pseudobrassaium 
Heptapleurum pseudospicatum 
Heptapleurum pushpangadanii 
Heptapleurum quadripetalum 
Heptapleurum quangtriense 
Heptapleurum racemosum 
Heptapleurum reinianum 
Heptapleurum remotiserratum 
Heptapleurum reticulatum 
Heptapleurum rhododendrifolium 
Heptapleurum rhynchocarpum 
Heptapleurum ridleyi 
Heptapleurum rigidum 
Heptapleurum rostratum 
Heptapleurum rudolfi 
Heptapleurum rugosum 
Heptapleurum sabahense 
Heptapleurum santosii 
Heptapleurum sarasinorum 
Heptapleurum scandens 
Heptapleurum schizophyllum 
Heptapleurum schultzei 
Heptapleurum schumannianum 
Heptapleurum scytinophyllum 
Heptapleurum secundum 
Heptapleurum sepikianum 
Heptapleurum serpentinicola 
Heptapleurum serratum 
Heptapleurum sessile 
Heptapleurum setulosum 
Heptapleurum shweliense 
Heptapleurum siamense 
Heptapleurum sibayakense 
Heptapleurum simbuense 
Heptapleurum simplicifolium 
Heptapleurum singalangense 
Heptapleurum singulare 
Heptapleurum spaniodon 
Heptapleurum stellatum 
Heptapleurum stellulatum 
Heptapleurum stenopetalum 
Heptapleurum stenophyllum 
Heptapleurum stolleanum 
Heptapleurum stramineum 
Heptapleurum subavene 
Heptapleurum subdivaricatum 
Heptapleurum subintegrum 
Heptapleurum taiwanianum 
Heptapleurum tambuyukonense 
Heptapleurum tanjiewhoeianum 
Heptapleurum tanyrhachis 
Heptapleurum tanytrichum 
Heptapleurum tetrandrum 
Heptapleurum thaumasianthum 
Heptapleurum tribracteolatum 
Heptapleurum trineurum 
Heptapleurum triste 
Heptapleurum truncatifructum 
Heptapleurum trungii 
Heptapleurum tunkinense 
Heptapleurum urdanetense 
Heptapleurum venulosum 
Heptapleurum versteegii 
Heptapleurum vidalianum 
Heptapleurum violeum 
Heptapleurum viridicephalum 
Heptapleurum wallichianum 
Heptapleurum wardii 
Heptapleurum waterhousei 
Heptapleurum winkleri 
Heptapleurum wrayi 
Heptapleurum yatesii 
Heptapleurum zhuanum

References

Heptapleurum